Muddy Water may refer to:

Music
"Muddy Water", a 1926 song with lyrics by Jo Trent and music by Peter DeRose & Harry Richman, covered by many artists
"Muddy Water", a song by English rock group Free, from the 1973 album Heartbreaker
"Muddy Water", a song by The Seldom Scene from the 1973 album Act III, covered by various artists
"Muddy Water", a song from the 1985 musical Big River: The Adventures of Huckleberry Finn
"Muddy Water", a song by country singer Clint Black from the 1990 album Put Yourself in My Shoes
"Muddy Water", a song by Dallas Crane from the 2006 album Factory Girls
"Muddy Water", a song by Eddi Reader from the 2007 album Peacetime
"Muddy Water" (Trace Adkins song), a 2008 single
"Muddy Water", a song by King Gizzard & the Lizard Wizard from the 2017 album Gumboot Soup

Literature
Muddy Water: Conversations with 11 Poets (2003), a book by Robert Budde

Places
Nam Khun ( literally: muddy water), a minor district in the southwestern part of Ubon Ratchathani Province, northeastern Thailand
Waipara (literally: muddy water), a small township in North Canterbury, New Zealand.

Other

See also
 Muddy Waters (born McKinley Morganfield, 1913–1983), American blues musician
 Muddy Waters (disambiguation)
"I'd Rather Drink Muddy Water", a song by Eddie Miller, recorded by Aretha Franklin as "Muddy Water"